Hannes Stiller, née Tobiasson (born 3 July 1978) is a Swedish former footballer who played as a striker.

Post-playing career
Stiller was appointed as club director of Ljungskile SK on 12 May 2016.
Stiller later became youth coach in IFK Göteborg, and became acting assistant manager on 24 June 2021.

Career statistics

Honours

Qviding FIF
Division 1 Södra: 2007

IFK Göteborg
Svenska Cupen: 2012–13

References

External links
 
 Elite Football profile
 

1978 births
Living people
Swedish footballers
Association football forwards
Allsvenskan players
Superettan players
Ettan Fotboll players
Qviding FIF players
Västra Frölunda IF players
IFK Göteborg players
Ljungskile SK players
Swedish football managers
IFK Göteborg non-playing staff
Footballers from Gothenburg